Afon Marlais may refer to:
 Afon Marlais, Carmarthenshire
 Afon Marlais, Pembrokeshire

See also 
 Afon Marlas